is a village located in Ishikari, Hokkaido, Japan.

As of September 2016, the village has an estimated population of 3,235. The total area is 78.24 km2.

Geography
Shinshinotsu is the smallest and the only village in Ishikari Subprefecture. Ishikari River flows the east of the village.

Neighbouring multiples
 Ishikari Subprefecture
 Ebetsu
 Tobetsu
 Sorachi Subprefecture
 Iwamizawa
 Tsukigata

Climate

History
1895: Shinshinotsu village split off from Shinotsu village (now a part of Ebetsu).
1915: Shinshinotsu village became a Second Class village.

Mascot 

Shinshinotsu's mascot is  who is a snowball. It wears a hat that resembles the observatory on Shinotsu Park. Its lips are pink as a result of the side effects of drinking doburoku sake. It cannot drink this sake without rice and side dishes. When people look at it, it reminds them of a rice bowl. Its charm point is its eyes and people can move its eyebrows. Its birthday is August 8. Its goal is to have a depiction of itself on the village's welcome sign.

Friendship city
 Yubetsu, Hokkaido

References

External links

Official Website 

Villages in Hokkaido